The 1997–98 daytime network television schedule for the six major English-language commercial broadcast networks in the United States covers the weekday and weekend daytime hours from September 1997 to August 1998. The schedule is followed by a list per network of returning series, new series, and series canceled after the 1996–97 season.

Affiliates fill time periods not occupied by network programs with local or syndicated programming. PBS – which offers daytime programming through a children's program block, branded as PTV at the time – is not included, as its member television stations have local flexibility over most of their schedules and broadcast times for network shows may vary.

Legend

 New series are highlighted in bold.

Schedule
 All times correspond to U.S. Eastern and Pacific Time scheduling (except for some live sports or events). Except where affiliates slot certain programs outside their network-dictated timeslots, subtract one hour for Central, Mountain, Alaska, and Hawaii-Aleutian times.
 Local schedules may differ, as affiliates have the option to pre-empt or delay network programs. Such scheduling may be limited to preemptions caused by local or national breaking news or weather coverage (which may force stations to tape delay certain programs in overnight timeslots or defer them to a co-operated or contracted station in their regular timeslot) and any major sports events scheduled to air in a weekday timeslot (mainly during major holidays). Stations may air shows at other times at their preference.

Monday–Friday

Notes:
 ABC, NBC and CBS offered their early morning newscasts via a looping feed (usually running as late as 10:00 a.m. Pacific Time) to accommodate local scheduling in the westernmost contiguous time zones or for use a filler programming for stations that do not offer a local morning newscast; some stations without a morning newscast may air syndicated or time-lease programs instead of the full newscast loop.
 NBC allowed owned-and-operated and affiliated stations the preference of airing Another World and Days of Our Lives in reverse order from the network's recommended scheduling. Some NBC affiliates did not air Sunset Beach in the noon timeslot, opting to air local news and/or syndicated programming instead, and often placing the soap opera in a late morning or afternoon time slot.
 Fox Kids temporarily aired Eerie, Indiana Mondays and Wednesdays at 4:30 p.m. ET from November 10, 1997 to January 2, 1998.

Saturday

Notes:
 Kids' WB temporarily aired Animaniacs aired at 8:00 a.m. ET until October 25, The New Batman/Superman Adventures aired at 9:00 a.m. ET until October 11, and The Legend of Calamity Jane aired at 10:00 a.m. ET from September 13 to 27, 1997.

Sunday

By network

ABC

Returning series:
ABC World News This Morning
ABC World News Tonight with Peter Jennings
All My Children
The Bugs Bunny and Tweety Show
Brand Spanking New! Doug
General Hospital
Good Morning America
Good Morning America Sunday
Jungle Cubs
The New Adventures of Winnie the Pooh 
One Life to Live
Port Charles
Schoolhouse Rock! 
This Week
The View

New series:
101 Dalmatians: The Series
Disney's One Saturday Morning
Recess
Pepper Ann
Science Court

Not returning from 1996–97:
ABC Weekend Special
Bone Chillers
Caryl & Marilyn: Real Friends
The City
DuckTales 
Flash Forward
Gargoyles: The Goliath Chronicles
The Mighty Ducks
Nightmare Ned
Street Sharks

CBS

Returning series:
As the World Turns
Beakman's World
The Bold and the Beautiful
CBS Evening News
CBS Morning News
CBS News Sunday Morning
CBS Storybreak 
CBS This Morning
Face the Nation
Guiding Light
The Price Is Right
The Young and the Restless

New series:
CBS News Saturday Morning
Fudge 
The New Ghostwriter Mysteries
The Sports Illustrated for Kids Show
The Weird Al Show
Wheel 2000

Not returning from 1996–97:
Ace Ventura: Pet Detective
Bailey Kipper's P.O.V.
The Mask: The Animated Series
Project Geeker
Secrets of the Cryptkeeper's Haunted House
Teenage Mutant Ninja Turtles
The Lion King's Timon & Pumbaa
The Twisted Tales of Felix the Cat

NBC

Returning series:
Another World
Days of Our Lives
Hang Time
Leeza
Meet the Press
NBA Inside Stuff
NBC News at Sunrise
NBC Nightly News
Saved by the Bell: The New Class
Sunset Beach
Today

New series:
City Guys

Not returning from 1996–97:
California Dreams
Real Life with Jane Pauley

Fox

Returning series:
Bobby's World
C Bear and Jamal
Eerie, Indiana 
Fox News Sunday
Goosebumps
Life with Louie
Power Rangers Power Playback
Power Rangers Turbo
Spider-Man
The Spooktacular New Adventures of Casper
Stickin' Around
X-Men

New series:
The Adventures of Sam & Max: Freelance Police
Beetleborgs Metallix
Cartoon Cabana
Eerie, Indiana: The Other Dimension
Mowgli: The New Adventures of the Jungle Book
Ned's Newt
Ninja Turtles: The Next Mutation
Power Rangers in Space
Silver Surfer
Space Goofs
Toonsylvania

Not returning from 1996–97:
The Adventures of Batman & Robin
Big Bad Beetleborgs
Eek! Stravaganza
Fox After Breakfast
Fox's Peter Pan & the Pirates 
Power Rangers Zeo
The Tick
Where on Earth Is Carmen Sandiego?

UPN

Returning series:
The Incredible Hulk
Jumanji

New series:
Algo's FACTory
Breaker High
Sweet Valley High

Not returning from 1996–97:
Bureau of Alien Detectors
The Mouse and the Monster

The WB

Returning series:
Animaniacs
Bugs 'n' Daffy
Pinky and the Brain
Superman: The Animated Series
The Sylvester & Tweety Mysteries

New series:
Batman: The Animated Series 
Captain Planet and the Planeteers 
Channel Umptee-3
The Legend of Calamity Jane
Men in Black: The Series
The New Batman Adventures
Tiny Toon Adventures 

Not returning from 1996–97:
The Daffy Duck Show
Earthworm Jim
Freakazoid!
Road Rovers
Waynehead

See also
1997-98 United States network television schedule (prime-time)
1997-98 United States network television schedule (late night)

References

Sources
https://web.archive.org/web/20071015122215/http://curtalliaume.com/abc_day.html
https://web.archive.org/web/20071015122235/http://curtalliaume.com/cbs_day.html
https://web.archive.org/web/20071012211242/http://curtalliaume.com/nbc_day.html
https://kidsblockblog.wordpress.com/2012/10/25/fox-kids-weekday-lineups-1997-1998/
https://www.cs.cmu.edu/~aarong/from-andrew/wb/kidswb-schedule.html
https://www.cs.cmu.edu/~aarong/from-andrew/upn/upnkids-schedule.html

United States weekday network television schedules
1997 in American television
1998 in American television